The European Neural Network Society (ENNS) is an association of scientists, engineers, students, and others seeking to learn about and advance understanding of artificial neural networks. Specific areas of interest in this scientific field include modelling of behavioral and brain processes, development of neural algorithms and applying neural modelling concepts to problems relevant in many different domains. Erkki Oja and John G. Taylor are past ENNS presidents and honorary executive board members.  its president is Věra Kůrková.

Every year since 1991 ENNS organizes the International Conference on Artificial Neural Networks (ICANN). The history and the links to past conferences are available at the ENNS web site. This is one of the oldest and best established conferences on the subject, with proceedings published in Springer Lecture Notes in Computer Science, see index in DBLP bibliography database.

As a non-profit organization ENNS promotes scientific activities at European and at the national levels in cooperation with national organizations that focus on neural networks. Every year many stipends to attend ICANN conference are given. ENNS also sponsors other students and have given awards and prizes at co-sponsored events (schools, workshops, conferences and competitions).

References

External links 
 

Artificial intelligence associations
Artificial neural networks
Elsevier academic journals